Deiregyne is a genus of flowering plants from the orchid family, Orchidaceae, native to Mexico, Guatemala and Honduras.

Species
Species currently accepted as of June 2014:

Deiregyne alinae Szlach. - Michoacán
Deiregyne chartacea (L.O.Williams) Garay - central Mexico
Deiregyne cochleata Szlach., R.González & Rutk. - Tamaulipas
Deiregyne densiflora (C.Schweinf.) Salazar & Soto Arenas - central Mexico south to Oaxaca
Deiregyne diaphana (Lindl.) Garay - Oaxaca
Deiregyne eriophora (B.L.Rob. & Greenm.) Garay - central Mexico south to Guatemala
Deiregyne falcata (L.O.Williams) Garay - Mexico and Honduras
Deiregyne nonantzin (R.González ex McVaugh) Catling - Jalisco
Deiregyne obtecta (C.Schweinf.) Garay - Guatemala
Deiregyne pallens (Szlach.) Espejo & López-Ferr. - Guerrero, Oaxaca
Deiregyne pseudopyramidalis (L.O.Williams) Garay - Oaxaca
Deiregyne pterygodium Szlach. - México State
Deiregyne ramirezii R.González - Jalisco
Deiregyne rhombilabia Garay - Michoacán, Morelos, Oaxaca, Puebla
Deiregyne sheviakiana (Szlach.) Espejo & López-Ferr. - Chiapas
Deiregyne tamayoi Szlach. - Jalisco
Deiregyne thelyrnitra (Rchb.f.) Schltr. - Guatemala
Deiregyne velata (B.L.Rob. & Fernald) Garay - Chihuahua, Durango

See also 
 List of Orchidaceae genera

References

External links 
 
 

Orchids of Mexico
Orchids of Guatemala
Orchids of Honduras
Cranichideae genera
Spiranthinae